William Jerome Coombs (December 24, 1833 – January 12, 1922) was a Bourbon Democrat member of the United States House of Representatives from New York, serving two terms from 1891 to 1895.

Biography 
Born in Jordan, New York, Coombs attended the Jordan Academy there.  He moved to New York City in 1850, and in 1855 to Brooklyn.  In 1856, he started a business exporting American products, which he did for the next 37 years.

Congress 
He ran for Congress in 1888, but lost.  Coombs ran again in 1890 and was elected as a Democrat to the Fifty-second Congress.  He ran for reelection in 1892 and won a seat in the Fifty-third Congress.  He was an unsuccessful candidate for reelection in 1894.

President Grover Cleveland appointed Coombs a director of the Union Pacific Railroad in 1894, with special commission to collect the debts due the United States Government from the various Pacific railroads.

Later career and death 
Coombs later served as president of the Manufacturers' Terminal Co., and after that headed the Title Guarantee & Trust Co. of Brooklyn.

In 1904, Coombs became president of the South Brooklyn Savings Institution, in which capacity he served until his death on January 12, 1922, age 88.  He was interred in Green-Wood Cemetery.

Family 
His son Charles Adams Coombs married novelist Anne Sheldon Coombs.

References

1833 births
1922 deaths
People from Jordan, New York
American bank presidents
Burials at Green-Wood Cemetery
Union Pacific Railroad people
Democratic Party members of the United States House of Representatives from New York (state)